Sandra Bass is an American political scientist. She holds a PhD in political science from University of California, Berkeley.  She is an Associate Dean of Students and Director of the Public Service Center at the University of California, Berkeley, a position she has held since 2015. Bass has written articles on the relationship between race and policing in the United States, including "Policing Space, Policing Race: Social Control Imperatives and Police Discretionary Decisions," published in Social Justice. She is a former board chair of the Ella Baker Center for Human Rights.

References 

Living people
African-American political scientists
American women academics
American academic administrators
UC Berkeley College of Letters and Science alumni
Year of birth missing (living people)
American women political scientists
American political scientists
21st-century African-American people
21st-century African-American women